Lepidomyia is a genus of hoverflies

Species
L. abdominalis (Williston, 1888)
L. calopus (Loew, 1864)
L. cincta Bigot, 1883
L. lugens
L. micheneri (Fluke, 1888)
L. ortalina (Wulp, 1888)
L. strigosellacola
L. trilineata (Hull, 1941)

References

Hoverfly genera
Taxa named by Hermann Loew